Grandmaster Flash & The Furious Five is a compilation album release by Grandmaster Flash & the Furious Five (On The Strength is their official second album). It was released in July 1983, and it is a compilation of their Sugar Hill Records hit singles including "The Message", "New York New York", and "White Lines". Over half of the tracks were single-only releases prior to this compilation.

Track listing
"White Lines (Don't Don't Do It)"
"The Party Mix"
"The Message"
"New York New York"
"Freedom"
"The Wheels Of Steel"
"It's Nasty (Genius of Love)"

Grandmaster Flash and the Furious Five albums
1983 compilation albums
Albums produced by Grandmaster Flash